Kailash Pati Sinha was an Indian politician. He was elected to the Lok Sabha, the lower house of the Parliament of India from Nalanda, Bihar as a member of the Indian National Congress.

References

External links
Official biographical sketch in Parliament of India website

1905 births
Year of death missing
Indian National Congress politicians
Lok Sabha members from Bihar
India MPs 1952–1957
India MPs 1957–1962